The Mount Crosby Weir is a heritage-listed weir on the Brisbane River at Mount Crosby and Chuwar, both in City of Brisbane, Queensland, Australia. The project was instigated by John Petrie at the end of the 19th century. The town of Brisbane was expanding and seeking more reliable sources of drinking water than Enoggera Dam and Gold Creek Dam could provide. In conjunction with the Mount Crosby Pumping Station, it was listed on the  Queensland Heritage Register on 25 October 2019.

Location and features
The location was selected because it was just above the upstream tidal flow of seawater at Colleges Crossing. The concrete structure was completed in April 1892. Above the weir is a one-lane road which is open to the public.

The nearby Mount Crosby Pumping Station is used to transport drinking water that is sourced from both the weir and the nearby Lake Manchester Dam, which was built shortly after the Mount Crosby Weir.

Without an ongoing eradication program, water hyacinth weed can choke the waters behind the weir, all the way upstream to Fernvale. In 2009, the weir was flushed to remove algae and organic matter that had built up.

Heritage listing

See also

List of dams in Queensland
South East Queensland Water Grid

References

1892 establishments in Australia
Brisbane River
Dams completed in 1892
Dams in Queensland
Weirs